Suwannee may refer to:

Suwannee, Florida, a town in Dixie County
 Suwannee County, Florida
 Suwannee River
 USS Suwannee (CVE-27)
 Suwannee point, projectile point

See also

 Suwanee (disambiguation)
 Sewanee (disambiguation)
 Swanee (disambiguation)